Xian Ghislaine Emmers (born 20 July 1999) is a Belgian professional footballer who plays as a midfielder for Liga I club Rapid București.

Club career
He made his Serie B debut for Cremonese on 31 August 2018 in a game against Palermo.

On 11 July 2019 Emmers joined Belgian side Waasland-Beveren on year-long deal.

On 8 August 2020 went to Almere City on loan.

On 11 August 2021, Emmers joined Roda JC Kerkrade on a free transfer.

Personal life
Emmers is the son of the former Belgium international footballer Marc Emmers.

References

External links
 

1999 births
Sportspeople from Lugano
Footballers from Limburg (Belgium)
Living people
Belgian footballers
Belgian expatriate footballers
Belgium youth international footballers
Inter Milan players
U.S. Cremonese players
S.K. Beveren players
Almere City FC players
Roda JC Kerkrade players
FC Rapid București players
Serie B players
Eerste Divisie players
Belgian Pro League players
Liga I players
Expatriate footballers in Italy
Expatriate footballers in the Netherlands
Expatriate footballers in Romania
Belgian expatriate sportspeople in Italy
Belgian expatriate sportspeople in the Netherlands
Belgian expatriate sportspeople in Romania
Association football midfielders